M. H. Maqsood (date of birth unknown, died 19 February 1975) was an Indian cricketer. He played seven first-class matches for Delhi between 1934 and 1945.

See also
 List of Delhi cricketers

References

External links
 

Year of birth missing
1975 deaths
Indian cricketers
Delhi cricketers
Place of birth missing